Deewana Tere Naam Ka is a 1987 Indian Hindi romantic drama film directed by Deepak Bahry, starring Mithun Chakraborty, Vijayeta Pandit, Danny Denzongpa, Jagdeep and Sharat Saxena.

Songs

Cast
Mithun Chakraborty as Shankar 
Vijayeta Pandit as Reshma 
Danny Denzongpa as Shambhu 
Jagdeep as Dilip Devraj Ghayal Shikarpuri 
Seema Deo as Shankar's Foster Mother 
Kamal Kapoor as Thakur  
Yunus Parvez as Munim 
Sharat Saxena as Munim's Adopted Son 
Huma Khan as Dancer
Leena Das as Dancer / Singer 
Jayshree T. as Dancer / Singer

External links
 

1987 films
1980s Hindi-language films
Indian drama films
1987 drama films
Hindi-language drama films
Films directed by Deepak Bahry